The 2014 Gent–Wevelgem was the 76th running of the Gent–Wevelgem single-day cycling race. It was won by John Degenkolb in the sprint ahead of Arnaud Démare and Peter Sagan.

Teams
As Gent–Wevelgem was a UCI World Tour event, all 18 UCI ProTeams were invited automatically and obligated to send a squad. Seven other squads were given wildcard places, thus completing the 25-team peloton.

The 25 teams that competed in the race were:

Results

References

External links

Gent-Wevelgem
Gent-Wevelgem
Gent–Wevelgem